"Wait" is a power ballad recorded by White Lion and written by White Lion vocalist Mike Tramp and guitarist Vito Bratta. It was the lead single from their second album, Pride.

The single was released on June 1, 1987, but did not chart until February 1988. In May 1988, "Wait" finally cracked the top 10 in the US, peaking at No. 8, due in no small part to MTV airing its music video in regular rotation—nearly seven months after the single's release. The song also charted at #48 in Canada and #88 in the UK.

Music video
The music video featured Christie Muhaw of The Flirts, who died in a car accident less than a year after the video propelled the song into the top 10. Her death at only 24 years old made the song's lyrics especially poignant.

Background

Singer Mike Tramp said,

Versions
"Wait" featured an extended remix which was released as a bonus track on "Pride". The song was also re-recorded in 1999 on the album Remembering White Lion (also released as "Last Roar" in 2004) and a live version was released in 2005 on the White Lion live album Rocking the USA. The live version was released as a promo and later iTunes single and also features as a bonus track on the bands most recent album Return of the Pride.

Track listing
"Wait" – 4:00
"Don't Give Up" – 3:15

Personnel
Mike Tramp – Lead vocals
Vito Bratta – Guitars
James LoMenzo – Bass guitar
Greg D'Angelo – drums

Charts

Weekly charts

Year-end charts

References

1987 singles
1987 songs
Atlantic Records singles
Songs written by Mike Tramp
Songs written by Vito Bratta
White Lion songs
Glam metal ballads